The Warren Stamping Plant is a Stellantis North America automotive factory in Warren, Michigan that produces auto parts for Chrysler vehicles. The factory was completed in 1948 and began production in 1949. The nearby Chrysler facilities are the Warren Truck Assembly and the Mack Engine Complex.  The Mound Road Engine plant closed in the early 2000s; the site is now a vehicle storage lot. 

There also was once the nearby "Sherwood Assembly" that closed in the late 1970s when Chrysler halted production of the Dodge Medium and Heavy Duty trucks and exited the market. Sherwood Assembly has since been torn down.

The facility was built in 1948 and started production in 1949. Further expansions of the plant came in 1952, 1964, 1965 and 1986.

Products made 
Stampings and assemblies including hoods, roofs, liftgates, side apertures, fenders and floor pans. These provided parts for the many Chrysler vehicles, including in recent years the Dodge Grand Caravan, Chrysler Town & Country, Jeep Grand Cherokee and Ram Trucks.

References

External links
 

Chrysler factories
Buildings and structures in Macomb County, Michigan
1949 establishments in Michigan
Warren, Michigan